Lydia Crossman (born 29 September 1986) is a former New Zealand rugby union player.

Biography 
Crossman first played rugby when she was five. She captained her Epsom Girls' Grammar School rugby team.

Crossman was named in the Black Ferns squad in a three Test tour to England in 2011. She made her international debut on 29 November 2011 against England at Esher.

A year later, Crossman was again selected for the Black Ferns in another three Test tour of England. She was sin binned in the first test for an infringement. Crossman made her last appearance for New Zealand in the third test.

In 2016, Crossman was named in a wider training squad.

References

External links 

 Black Ferns Profile

1986 births
Living people
New Zealand female rugby union players
New Zealand women's international rugby union players